Biocellata ockendeni is a moth in the family Cossidae first described by Herbert Druce in 1906.

References

Cossulinae
Moths described in 1906